The Fear Inside may refer to:
 The Fear Inside (film)
 The Fear Inside (song)